Ahmed Ismail or Ahmad Ismail, Ahmed Esmaeel, Ahmad Esmaeel is an Arabic name, it may refer to a person with Ahmed given name and had a father called Ismail, or part of person's Patronymic name which refer him as the son of Ahmed and grandson of Ismail or even grandson of Ahmed and great-grandson of Ismail

Ahmed Ismail El Shamy (born 1975), Egyptian boxer
Ahmad Isma'il 'Uthman Saleh (died 2000), Egyptian Islamic Jihad
Ahmad Ismail Ali (1917–1974). Egyptian soldier, Commander-in-Chief and minister of war during the October War of 1973
Ahmad Ismail (Malaysian politician) (born 1955)
Ahmed Yassin (Sheikh Ahmed Ismail Hassan Yassin, 1937–2004), Palestinian imam and politician
Ahmed Ismail Samatar (born before 1978), Somali writer and academic
Ahmed Mohamed Ismail (born 1964), Somali Olympic marathon runner
Ismail Ahmed Ismail (born 1984), Sudanese runner
Sultan Ahmed Ismail (born 1951), Indian soil biologist and ecologist
Ahmad Samani (Ahmad ibn Ismail, died 914), amir of the Samanids

See also
Ismail Ahmed (disambiguation)